The Samyang Reflex 300mm f/6.3 UMC CS is an interchangeable camera lens announced by Samyang on April 28, 2014.

References
http://www.dpreview.com/products/samyang/lenses/samyang_300_6p3_slr/specifications

Camera lenses introduced in 2014
300